The following is a list of comics based on fiction, including novels, books or short stories.

Novels

0—9
 7 Billion Needles Vols. 1—4 (Vertical, October 2010—May 2011)

Aelita

Alex Rider

Alice's Adventures in Wonderland

Amtor

Anita Blake: Vampire Hunter

Anne Rice

Artemis Fowl

B
 Barsoom:
 John Carter of Mars (1939), The Funnies #30—56 (Dell Comics, April 1939—June 1941)
 John Carter of Mars (1952), Four Color (Volume 2) #375, #437, #488 (Dell Comics, February 1952, November 1952, August 1953)
 A Princess of Mars, Tarzan #207—209 (DC Comics, April—June 1972); Weird Worlds #1—2 (DC Comics, September—November 1972)
 The Gods of Mars, Weird Worlds #2—7 (DC Comics, November 1972—March 1973)
 "Amazon of Barsoom", Tarzan Family #60 (DC Comics, November-December 1975)
 "The Girl in the Emerald", Tarzan Family #62 (DC Comics, March-April 1976)
 "Death Has Three Heads", Tarzan Family #63 (DC Comics, May-June 1976)
 "Lights of Doom", Tarzan Family #64 (DC Comics, July-August 1976)
 John Carter, Warlord of Mars (1977) #1—28 (Marvel Comics, June 1977—October 1979)
 Warlord of Mars #0—100 (Dynamite Entertainment, October 2010—July 2014)
 Warlord of Mars: Dejah Thoris #1—37 (Dynamite Entertainment, March 2011—March 2014)
 Warlord of Mars: Fall of Barsoom #1—5 (Dynamite Entertainment, July 2011—January 2012)
 John Carter: A Princess of Mars #1—5 (Marvel Comics, November 2011—March 2012)
 Warriors of Mars #1—5 (Dynamite Entertainment, January—October 2012)
 Dejah Thoris and the White Apes of Mars #1—4 (Dynamite Entertainment, April—July 2012)
 John Carter: The Gods of Mars #1—5 (Marvel Comics, May—September 2012)
 Dejah Thoris and the Green Men of Mars #1—12 (Dynamite Entertainment, February 2013—March 2014)
 Lords of Mars #1—6 (Dynamite Entertainment, August 2013—January 2014)
 Dejah of Mars #1—4 (Dynamite Entertainment, May—September 2014)
 John Carter, Warlord of Mars (2014) #1—14 (Dynamite Entertainment, November 2014—2015)
 Dejah Thoris (Volume 1) #1—6 (Dynamite Entertainment, 2016)
 John Carter: The End #1—5 (Dynamite Entertainment, 2017)
 Dejah Thoris (Volume 2) #0—10 (Dynamite Entertainment, January—November 2018)
 Vampirella/Dejah Thoris #1—5 (Dynamite Entertainment, September 2018—February 2019)
 Barbarella/Dejah Thoris #1—4 (Dynamite Entertainment, January—June 2019)
 Warlord of Mars Attacks #1—5 (Dynamite Entertainment, June—October 2019)
 Dejah Thoris (Volume 3) #1—12 (Dynamite Entertainment, December 2019—April 2021)
 Dejah Thoris vs. John Carter of Mars #1—6 (Dynamite Entertainment, July 2021—January 2022)
 John Carter of Mars (2022) #1—5 (Dynamite Entertainment, April—August 2022)
 Dejah Thoris: Fairy Tales (Dynamite Entertainment, August 2022) 
 Batman: The Ultimate Evil (DC Comics, November—December 1995)
 Battle Royale:
 Battle Royale, Young Champion (Akita Shoten, 2000—2005)
 Battle Royale II: Blitz Royale (Akita Shoten, December 2003—May 2004)
 Belphegor
 Biggles
 Black Beauty:
 Black Beauty, Classics Illustrated #60 (Gilberton Company, Inc., June 1949)
 The Famous Horse Classic — Black Beauty, Four Color (Volume 2) #440 (Dell Comics, December 1952)
 Son of Black Beauty, Four Color (Volume 2) #510, #566 (Dell Comics, November 1953, June 1954)
 Black Beauty, Now Age Books (Pendulum Press, January 1973) 
 Bob Morane, based on the eponymous series by Henri Vernes
 Bob, Son of Battle, based on Owd Bob (1898) by Alfred Ollivant, Four Color (Volume 2) #729 (Dell Comics, November 1956)

Bounty trilogy

C
 Captains Courageous, Classics Illustrated #117 (Gilberton Company, Inc., March 1954)
 Carmilla #1—6 (Aircel Comics, February—July 1991)
 City of Glass (Picador, August 2004)
 Cleopatra, Classics Illustrated #161 (Gilberton Company, Inc., March 1961)
 Clive Barker:
 Clive Barker's The Great and Secret Show #1—12 (IDW Publishing, March 2006—May 2007)
 Clive Barker's The Thief of Always #1—3 (IDW Publishing, January—May 2005)
 The Cloister and the Hearth, Classics Illustrated #66 (Gilberton Company, Inc., December 1949)
 Conan:
 Conan the Barbarian (Marvel Comics, October 1970—December 1993)
 Savage Sword of Conan (Marvel Comics, August 1974—July 1995)
 Conan (Dark Horse Comics, November 2003—February 2018)
 A Connecticut Yankee in King Arthur's Court, Classic Comics #24 (Gilberton Company, Inc., September 1945)
 The Corsican Brothers, Classic Comics #20 (Gilberton Company, Inc., June 1944)
 Crime and Punishment
 Crouching Tiger, Hidden Dragon Vols. 1—12 (HK Comics Limited (Hong Kong), 2002—2005)

D
Dallas Barr
 The Dark Tower:
 The Dark Tower: The Gunslinger Born #1—7 (Marvel Comics, April—October 2007)
 The Dark Tower: The Long Road Home #1—5 (Marvel Comics, May—September 2008)
 The Dark Tower: Treachery #1—6 (Marvel Comics, November 2008—April 2009)
 Dirk Gently's Holistic Detective Agency:
 Dirk Gently's Holistic Detective Agency #1—5 (IDW Publishing, May—October 2015)
 Dirk Gently's Holistic Detective Agency: A Spoon Too Short #1—5 (IDW Publishing, February—June 2016)
 Dirk Gently's Holistic Detective Agency: The Salmon of Doubt  #1—9 (IDW Publishing, October 2016—June 2017)
 Discworld:
 The Colour of Magic #1—4 (Innovation Publishing, 1991)
 The Light Fantastic #1—4 (Innovation Publishing, June 1992—February 1993)
 Mort: A Discworld Big Comic (VG Graphics, December 1994)
 Dixie Dugan, Volume 1 #1—13 (McNaught Syndicate, July 1942—1949); Volume 2 #1—4 (Headline Publications, February—November 1952); Volume 3 (Headline Publications, February 1953—February 1954)
 Do Androids Dream of Electric Sheep?:
 Do Androids Dream of Electric Sheep? #1—24 (Boom! Studios, June 2009—May 2011)
 Do Androids Dream of Electric Sheep?: Dust to Dust #1—8 (Boom! Studios, May—December 2010)
Doc Savage:
 Doc Savage (1966) #1 (Gold Key Comics, November 1966)
 Doc Savage: The Man of Bronze (1972) #1—8 (Marvel Comics, October 1972—January 1974)
 Doc Savage: Devil's Thoughts (1991) #1—3 (Millennium Publications, August—October 1991)
 Doc Savage: The Man of Bronze (1991) #1—4 (Millennium Publications, November 1991—May 1992)
 Doc Savage: Doom Dynasty #1—2 (Millennium Publications, May—July 1991)
 Doc Savage: Curse of the Fire God #1—4 (Dark Horse Comics, September—November 1995)
 Doc Savage: The Man of Bronze (2013) #1—8 (Dynamite Entertainment, December 2013—July 2014)
 Doc Savage: The Man of Bronze Annual (Dynamite Entertainment, May 2014)
 Doc Savage Special: Woman of Bronze (Dynamite Entertainment, December 2014)
 Doc Savage: The Spider's Web #1—5 (Dynamite Entertainment, 2015—2016)
 Doc Savage: The Ring of Fire #1—4 (Dynamite Entertainment, March—July 2017)
Dracula:
 The Tomb of Dracula #1—70 (Marvel Comics, April 1972—August 1979)
 Dracula, Now Age Books (Pendulum Press, May 1973)
 Blood of Dracula #1—19 (Apple Press, November 1987—November 1990)
 Dracula #1—4 (Eternity Comics, December 1989—March 1990)
 Dracula: The Lady in the Tomb #1 (Eternity Comics, January 1991)
 Big Bad Blood of Dracula #1—2 (Apple Press, July—September 1991)
 Ghosts of Dracula #1—5 (Eternity Comics, September 1991—January 1992)
 Dracula in Hell #1—2 (Apple Press, January—March 1992)
 Dracula: Return of the Impaler #1—4 (Slave Labor Graphics, July 1993—May 1994)
 Dracula vs. Zorro #1—2 (Topps Comics, October—November 1993) 
 The Collector's Dracula #1—2 (Millennium Publications, March—June 1994)
 Dracula's Revenge #1—2 (IDW Publishing, April—May 2004)
 Dracula vs. King Arthur #1—4 (Silent Devil, June 2005—August 2006)
 Dracula vs. Capone #1 (Silent Devil, October 2006)
 Graphic Classics: Dracula (Barron's, October 2007)
 Dracula Meets the Wolfman #1 (Image Comics, August 2008)
 The Complete Dracula #1—5 (Dynamite Entertainment, May—December 2009)
 Harker (Markosia, November 2009)
 Bram Stoker's Death Ship: The Last Voyage of the Demeter (IDW Publishing, May—August 2010)
 Dracula: The Company of Monsters #1—12 (Boom! Studios, August 2010—July 2011)
 The Dresden Files
 Dune:
 Dune: House Atreides #1—12 (Boom! Studios, October 2020—December 2021)
 Dune: Blood of the Sardaukar #1 (Boom! Studios, July 2021)
 Dune: A Whisper of Caladan Seas #1 (Boom! Studios, December 2021)
 Dune: The Waters of Kanly #1—4 (Boom! Studios, May—August 2022)
 Dune: House Harkonnen (Boom! Studios, forthcoming 2023)

E
Ender's Game
The Exile: An Outlander Graphic Novel

F
Fahrenheit 451
Faust:
Faust (manga)
Faust (series of comic books)
Fear and Loathing in Las Vegas #1—4 (IDW Publishing, May—August 2016)
Fevre Dream #1—10 (Avatar Press, March—November 2010)
A Fine and Private Place #1 (IDW Publishing, September 2012)
The Food of the Gods and How It Came to Earth:
The Food of the Gods, Classics Illustrated #160 (Gilberton Company, Inc., January 1961)
Food of the Gods, Marvel Classics Comics #22 (Marvel Comics, October 1977)
The Forever War
Frankenstein:
Frankenstein, Prize Comics #7—68 (Crestwood Publications, December 1940—March 1948); Regular series #1—33 (Crestwood Publications, 1945—November 1954)
Frankenstein, Classic Comics #26 (Gilberton Company, Inc., December 1945)
Frankenstein, Marvel Classics Comics #20 (Marvel Comics, August 1977)
Frankenstein (Eternity Comics, March—August 1989)
Frankenstein: or The Modern Prometheus (Caliber Comics, 1994)
Graphic Classics: Frankenstein (Barron's, April 2008)
Jingle Belle: Santa Claus vs. Frankenstein (Top Cow Productions, December 2008)
Frankenstein Alive, Alive! (IDW Publishing, May 2012—January 2018)
 Manga Classics: Frankenstein (October 2020) 
 Fu Manchu

G 
 Goosebumps
 Great Expectations:
 Great Expectations, Classics Illustrated #43 (Gilberton Company, Inc., November 1947)
 Great Expectations (Classical Comics, April 2009)
 Manga Classics: Great Expectations (Udon Entertainment, May 2015)
 Great Mansions, Classics Illustrated #90 (Gilberton Company, Inc., December 1951)
 Gullivar Jones, Warrior of Mars, Creatures on the Loose #16–21 (Marvel Comics, March 1972—January 1973); Monsters Unleashed #4—8 (Marvel Comics, January—September 1974)
 Gulliver's Travels:
 Gulliver's Travels, Classic Comics #16, (Gilberton Company, Inc., December 1943)
 Gulliver's Travels (Dell Comics, November 1965)
 Gulliver's Travels (Campfire Classics, December 2010)

H
 Helena, based on the 1876 novel of the same title by Machado de Assis (NewPOP, 2014)
 The Hitchhiker's Guide to the Galaxy
 The Hobbit #1—3 (Eclipse Comics, 1989—1990)
 The Hunchback of Notre Dame:
 The Hunchback of Notre Dame, Classic Comics #18, (Gilberton Company, Inc., March 1944)
 The Hunchback of Notre Dame, Now Age Books (Pendulum Press, 1974)
 Graphic Classics: The Hunchback of Notre Dame (Barron's, May 2007)
 The Hunchback of Notre Dame (Dark Horse Comics, July 2012)
 The Hurricane, Classics Illustrated #120 (Gilberton Company, Inc., June 1954)

I
 I Met a Handsome Cowboy, based on Clouds Over the Chupaderos (1943) by Elsa Barker, Four Color (Volume 2) #324 (Dell Comics, March 1951) 
Infected #1 (IDW Publishing, August 2012)
The Island of Doctor Moreau:
 The Island of Dr. Moreau (Insight Comics, October 2018)
 The Island of Dr. Moreau (IDW Publishing, July—August 2019)

James Bond

The Jungle Book

K
The Keep #1—5 (IDW Publishing, September 2005—March 2006)
Kidnapped:
 Kidnapped, Classics Illustrated #46 (Gilberton Company, Inc., April 1948)
 Kidnapped, Now Age Books (Pendulum Press, 1974)
 Graphic Classics: Kidnapped (Barron's, May 2007)
 Kidnapped (Tundra Publishing, August 2008)
 Kidnapped! #1—5, Marvel Illustrated (Marvel Comics, January—May 2009)
 Kidnapped (Campfire Classics, April 2011)
King — of the Khyber Rifles, Classics Illustrated #107 (Gilberton Company, Inc., May 1953)

Land of Oz

Largo Winch

The Last Unicorn

Leatherstocking Tales

Logan's Run

Luke Short

M
 Mack Bolan:
 Mack Bolan: The Executioner #1—3 (Innovation Publishing, July—November 1993)
 Don Pendleton's The Executioner: Death Squad (Vivid Comics, 1993)
 Don Pendleton's The Executioner: The Devil's Tools  #1—3 (IDW Publishing, April—August 1993)
 A Majmok Bolygója, based on Planet of the Apes (1963) by Pierre Boulle (Mokep, 1981)
 The Man Who Laughs, Classics Illustrated #71 (Gilberton Company, Inc., May 1950)
 The Master of Ballantrae, Classics Illustrated #82 (Gilberton Company, Inc., April 1951)
 Master of the World, Classics Illustrated #163 (Gilberton Company, Inc., July 1961)
 Men of Iron, Classics Illustrated #88 (Gilberton Company, Inc., October 1951)
 Mike Hammer:
 Mickey Spillane's Mike Hammer #1—4 (Titan Comics July—October 2018)
 Millennium:
 The Girl with the Dragon Tattoo #1—2 (Titan Comics, July—August 2017)
 The Girl Who Played with Fire #1—2 (Titan Comics, October-November 2017)
 The Girl Who Kicked the Hornet's Nest #1—2 (Titan Comics, January—February 2018)
 The Girl Who Danced With Death #1—3 (Titan Comics, September—November 2018) 
 Moby-Dick:
 Moby Dick, Classic Comics #5 (Gilberton Company, Inc., September 1942)
 Moby Dick #1—6, Marvel Illustrated (Marvel Comics, April—September 2008)
 Moby Dick (NBM, January 1998)
 Graphic Classics: Moby Dick (Barron's, May 2007)
 Moby Dick (Campfire Classics, July 2010)
 Mr Midshipman Easy, Classics Illustrated #74 (Gilberton Company, Inc., August 1950)
 The Mutineers, Classics Illustrated #122 (Gilberton Company, Inc., September 1954)

N
 Nancy Drew & The Hardy Boys
 Nestor Burma
 Neuromancer (Epic Comics, January 1989)

O
 The Ox-Bow Incident, Classics Illustrated #125 (Gilberton Company, Inc., March 1955)

P
Parker:
Richard Stark's Parker: The Hunter (IDW Publishing, July 2009)
Richard Stark's Parker: The Outfit (IDW Publishing, October 2010)
Richard Stark's Parker: The Score (IDW Publishing, July 2012)
Richard Stark's Parker: Slayground (IDW Publishing, December 2013)
 Pellucidar:
 At the Earth's Core, Korak, Son of Tarzan #46 (DC Comics, June 1972); Weird Worlds #1—5 (DC Comics, September 1972—April-May 1973)
 Pellucidar, Weird Worlds #6—7 (DC Comics, July—October 1973)
 Peter Pan:
 Peter Pan: Return to Never-Never Land #1—2 (Adventure Publications, July—August 1991)
 Peter Pan and the Warlords of Oz #1 (Hand of Doom, November 1998)
 Peter Pan and the Warlords of Oz: Wonderland Purgatory #0 (Hand of Doom, September 1999)
 Peter Pan and the Warlords of Oz: Dead Head Water #1 (Hand of Doom, 1999)
 Peter Pan the Vampire (Rentnarb Studios Comics, 2009)
 Peter Pan: A Graphic Novel (Stone Arch Books, August 2015)
 Peter Pan in Mummy Land (Stone Arch Books, January 2020)
The Phantom of the Opera
The Pilot, Classics Illustrated #70 (Gilberton Company, Inc., April 1950)

R
 Red Prophet: The Tales of Alvin Maker #1—12 (Dabel Brothers Productions, March 2006—March 2008)
 Return of the Gremlins #1—3, based on The Gremlins (1943) by Roald Dahl (Dark Horse Comics, March—May 2008)
 Richard Matheson:
 Richard Matheson's Hell House #1—4 (IDW Publishing, July—October 2015)
 Richard Matheson's I Am Legend #1—4 (Eclipse Comics, 1991)
 The Shrinking Man #1—4 (IDW Publishing, December 2004—June 2005)
 The Riftwar Cycle
 Rima the Jungle Girl #1—7 (DC Comics, April-May 1974—April-May 1975)

S
 The Saint #1—12 (Avon Comics, August 1947—March 1952)
 The Scottish Chiefs, based on the 1810 novel by Jane Porter (Classics Illustrated #67, Gilberton Company, Inc., January 1950)
The Sea Wolf, Classics Illustrated #85 (Gilberton Company, Inc., July 1951)
The Shadow
 Sherlock Holmes:
The Sign of the Four, Classic Comics #21 (Gilberton Company, Inc., July 1944)
The Adventures of Sherlock Holmes, Classic Classics #33 (Gilberton Company, Inc., January 1947)
A Study in Scarlet, Classics Illustrated #110 (Gilberton Company, Inc., August 1953)
Sherlock Holmes #1—2 (Charlton Comics, October 1955—March 1956)
The Great Adventures of Sherlock Holmes, Now Age Books (Pendulum Press, January 1974)
Sherlock Holmes #1 (DC Comics, September-October 1975)
Cases of Sherlock Holmes #1—20 (Renegade Press, May 1986—1990)
Scarlet in Gaslight #1—4 (Eternity Comics, November 1987—May 1989)
Sherlock Holmes: Sir Arthur Conan Doyle's A Study in Scarlet (Innovation Publishing, 1989)
Sherlock Holmes #1—23 (Eternity Comics, June 1988—May 1990)
Sherlock Holmes of the '30's #1—7 (Eternity Comics, January—July 1990)
Sherlock Holmes in the Case of the Missing Martian #1—4 (Eternity Comics, July—October 1990)
Sherlock Holmes: Chronicles of Crime and Mystery (Northstar Comics, February 1992)
Sherlock Holmes: Tales of Mystery and Suspense #1—3 (Northstar Comics, August 1992—March 1993)
Sherlock Holmes: Return of the Devil #1—2 (Adventure Publications, September—October 1992)
Sherlock Holmes: Adventure of the Opera Ghost (Caliber Comics, 1994)
Sherlock Holmes: Soul of the Dragon (Northstar Comics, December 1995)
Sherlock Holmes in — The Sussex Vampire (Caliber Press, 1996)
Sherlock Holmes Mysteries #1 (Moonstone Books, November 1997)
Sherlock Holmes: Dr. Jekyll & Mr. Holmes (Caliber Comics/Tome Press, 1998)
Sherlock Holmes and the Clown Prince of London (Moonstone Books, November 2001)
Sherlock Holmes & Kolchak: The Night Stalker #1—3 (Moonstone Books, March—August 2009) 
Sherlock Holmes #1—5 (Dynamite Entertainment, April—October 2009)
Victorian Undead: Sherlock Holmes vs. Zombies #1—6 (DC Comics/Wildstorm, January—June 2010)
Victorian Undead Special: Sherlock Holmes vs. Jekyll/Hyde #1 (DC Comics/Wildstorm, December 2010)
Victorian Undead II: Sherlock Holmes vs. Dracula #1—5 (DC Comics/Wildstorm, January—May 2011)
Sherlock Holmes: Year One #1—6 (Dynamic Planning, February—September 2011)
Sherlock Holmes: Victorian Knights #1—2 (TidalWave Productions, December 2011—January 2012)
Sherlock Holmes: The Liverpool Demon #1—5 (Dynamite Entertainment, December 2012—June 2013)
Domino Lady/Sherlock Holmes #1—2 (Moonstone Books, June—September 2013) 
Sherlock Holmes: Moriarty Lives #1—5 (Dynamite Entertainment, December 2013—July 2014)
Sherlock Holmes vs. Harry Houdini #1—5 (Dynamite Entertainment, October 2014—April 2015)
Sherlock Holmes: Murder at the Cabaret (Caliber Press, January 2018)
Sherlock Holmes: The Vanishing Man #1—4 (Dynamite Entertainment, May—August 2018) 
 Shaft:
 Shaft: A Complicated Man #1—6 (Dynamite Entertainment, December 2014—May 2015)
 Shaft: Imitation of Life #1—4 (Dynamite Entertainment, February—May 2016)
 Shutter Island (Tokyopop, October 2009)
 Silas Marner, Classics Illustrated #55, (Gilberton Company, Inc., January 1949)
 Silvertip, based on the eponymous series by Max Brand, Four Color (Volume 2) #491, #572, #608, #637, #667, #731, #789, #835, #898 (Dell Comics, August 1953, July 1954, December 1954, July 1955, December 1955, October 1956, April 1957, September 1957, May 1958)
 A Song of Ice and Fire:
 A Game of Thrones #1—24 (Dynamite Entertainment, September 2011—February 2015)
 A Clash of Kings #1—16 (Dynamite Entertainment, June 2017—March 2019)
 A Clash of Kings Part II #1—16 (Dynamite Entertainment, January 2020—November 2021)
 The Spy, Classics Illustrated #51 (Gilberton Company, Inc., September 1948)
The Stainless Steel Rat:
The Stainless Steel Rat, 2000 AD #140–151 (November 1979—February 1980)
The Stainless Steel Rat Saves the World, 2000 AD #166–177 (June—September 1980)
The Stainless Steel Rat for President, 2000 AD #393–404 (November 1984—February 1985)
The Stand:
The Stand: Captain Trips #1—5 (Marvel Comics, December 2008—March 2009)
The Stand: American Nightmares #1—5 (Marvel Comics, May—October 2009)
The Stand: Soul Survivors #1—5 (Marvel Comics, December 2009—May 2010)
The Stand: Hardcases #1—5 (Marvel Comics, August 2010—January 2011)
The Stand: No Man's Land #1—5 (Marvel Comics, April—August 2011)
The Stand: Night Has Come #1—6 (Marvel Comics, October 2011—March 2012)
Star Wars Legends:
Heir to the Empire #1—6 (Dark Horse Comics, October 1995—April 1996)
Splinter of the Mind's Eye #1—4 (Dark Horse Comics, December 1995—June 1996)
Shadows of the Empire #1—6 (Dark Horse Comics, May—October 1996)
Dark Force Rising #1—6 (Dark Horse Comics, May—October 1997)
The Last Command #1—6 (Dark Horse Comics, November 1997—July 1998)
Shadows of the Empire: Evolution #1—5 (Dark Horse Comics, February—June 1998)
The Swiss Family Robinson:
 Swiss Family Robinson, Classics Illustrated #42 (Gilberton Company, Inc., October 1947)
 The Swiss Family Robinson, Now Age Books (Pendulum Press, 1978)
Classic Comics: Swiss Family Robinson (Gallery Books, January 1990)
 The Swiss Family Robinson (Campfire, December 2009)

T
 Tales of Dunk and Egg:
 The Hedge Knight #1—6 (Image Comics/Devil's Due Publishing, August 2003—April 2003)
 The Hedge Knight II: Sworn Sword #1—6 (Marvel Comics, June 2007—June 2008)
 The Mystery Knight: A Graphic Novel (Bantam Books, August 2017)
 The Talisman, Classics Illustrated #111 (Gilberton Company, Inc., September 1953)
 Tarzan:
 Tarzan and the Devil Ogre, Four Color (Volume 2) #134 (Dell Comics, February 1947)
 Tarzan and the Fires of Tohr, Four Color (Volume 2) #161 (Dell Comics, August 1947)
 Tarzan of the Apes, Marvel Comics Super Special #29 (Marvel Comics, July 1984)
 Tarzan the Warrior #1—5 (Dark Horse Comics, March—August 1992)
 Tarzan: The Beckoning #1—7 (Malibu Comics, November 1992—June 1993) 
 Tarzan/John Carter: Warlords of Mars #1—4 (Dark Horse Comics, January—June 1996)
 Tarzan vs. Predator at the Earth's Core #1—4 (Dark Horse Comics, January—June 1996)
 The Return of Tarzan #1—3 (Dark Horse Comics, April—June 1997)
 Tarzan/Carson of Venus #1—4 (Dark Horse Comics, May—August 1998)
 Tarzan The Savage Heart #1—4 (Dark Horse Comics, April—July 1999)
 Tarzan: The Rivers of Blood #1—4 (Dark Horse Comics, November 1999—February 2000)
 Lord of the Jungle #1—15 (Dynamite Entertainment, January 2012—May 2013)
 The Once & Future Tarzan (Dark Horse Comics, November 2012)
 Lords of the Jungle — Featuring Tarzan and Sheena #1—6 (Dynamite Entertainment, March—August 2016)
 The Greatest Adventure #1—9 (Dynamite Entertainment, April 2017—February 2018)
 Red Sonja/Tarzan #1—6 (Dynamite Entertainment, May—December 2018)
 TekWar:
 TekWorld #1—24 (Marvel Comics/Epic Comics, September 1992—August 1994)
 William Shatner Presents: The Tek War Chronicles #1—8 (TidalWave Productions, June—December 2009)
 The Three Musketeers:
 The Three Musketeers, Classic Comics #1 (Gilberton Company, Inc., October 1941)
 The Three Musketeers, Now Age Books (Pendulum Press, 1974)
 The Three Musketeers #1—3 (Eternity Comics, December 1988—April 1989)
 Classic Comics: The Three Musketeers (Gallery Books, January 1990)
 The Three Musketeers #1—6, Marvel Illustrated (Marvel Comics, August 2008—January 2009)
 The 3 Musketeers (Campfire Classics, April 2011)
 Graphic Classics: The Three Musketeers (Barron's, October 2008)
 The Time Machine:
 The Time Machine, Classics Illustrated #133 (Gilberton Company, Inc., July 1956)
 The Time Machine, Now Age Books (Pendulum Press, June 1973)
 The Time Machine #1—3 (Eternity Comics, April—May 1990)
 The Time Machine (Insight Comics, April 2018)
 The Toilers of the Sea, Classics Illustrated #56 (Gilberton Company, Inc., February 1949)
 Tom Brown's School Days, Classics Illustrated #45 (Gilberton Company, Inc., January 1948)
 Treasure Island
 Twenty Thousand Leagues Under the Sea
 Twilight, by Stephenie Meyer:
 Twilight: The Graphic Novel Vols. 1—2 (Yen Press, March 2010—October 2011)
 New Moon: The Graphic Novel (Yen Press, April 2013)

U
 Uncle Tom's Cabin, Classic Comics #15 (Gilberton Company, Inc., November 1943)
 Under Two Flags, Classics Illustrated #86 (Gilberton Company, Inc., August 1951)

V
 The Vampire Chronicles:
 Anne Rice's The Vampire Lestat #1—12 (Innovation Publishing, January 1989—August 1991)
 Anne Rice's Interview with the Vampire #1—12 (Innovation Publishing, August 1991—January 1994)
 Anne Rice's The Queen of the Damned #1—11 (Innovation Publishing, October 1991—December 1993)
 Interview with the Vampire: Claudia's Story (Yen Comics, November 2012)
 Vampire Hunter D Vols. 1—8 (Media Factory, November 2007—September 2014)
 The Virginian, Classics Illustrated #150 (Gilberton Company, Inc., May 1959)

W
 The War of the Worlds:
 The War of the Worlds, Classics Illustrated #124 (Gilberton Company, Inc., January 1955)
 War of the Worlds, Amazing Adventures #18–39 (Marvel Comics, May 1973—November 1976)
 War of the Worlds #1—6 (Eternity Comics, 1988—1990)
 The War of the Worlds #1—5 (Caliber Press, 1996)
 The War of the Worlds: The Memphis Front #1—2 (Arrow Comics, 1998)
 Superman: War of the Worlds (DC Comics, October 1999) 
 The War of the Worlds (Dark Horse Comics, March 2006)
 War of the Worlds: Second Wave #1—6 (Boom! Studios, March—September 2006)
 The War of the Worlds (Insight Comics, January 2018)
 Waterloo, based on the 1865 novel by Erckmann-Chatrian, Classics Illustrated #111 (Gilberton Company, Inc., November 1956)
 Western Marshal, based on Trail Town (1941) by Ernest Haycox, Four Color (Volume 2) #534, #591, #613 and #640 (Dell Comics, February 1954, October 1954, February 1955 and August 1955)
 Westward Ho!, Classics Illustrated #14 (Gilberton Company, Inc., September 1943)
 The White Company, Classics Illustrated #102 (Gilberton Company, Inc., December 1952)
 White Fang:
 White Fang, Classics Illustrated #80 (Gilberton Company, Inc., February 1951)
 White Fang, Now Age Books (Pendulum Press, January 1977)
 Wild Cards
 Wuthering Heights:
 Wuthering Heights, Classics Illustrated #59 (Gilberton Company, Inc., May 1949)
 Wuthering Heights (Classical Comics, January 2011)
 Wyrms #1—6 (Dabel Brothers Productions/Marvel Comics, April 2006—January 2008)

Zane Grey

Zorro

Short fiction

See also
Lists of comics based on media
List of comics based on films
List of comics based on Hasbro properties
List of comics based on television programs
List of comics based on unproduced film projects
List of comics based on video games
Lists of media based on comics
List of films based on comics
List of novels based on comics
List of television programs based on comics
List of video games based on comics
Lists of media based on novels or short fiction
Lists of works of fiction made into feature films
List of short fiction made into feature films

References

 
Fiction